The Cambrai Memorial to the Missing (sometimes referred to as the Louverval Memorial) is a Commonwealth War Graves Commission (CWGC) memorial for the missing soldiers of World War I who fought in the Battle of Cambrai on the Western Front.

Foundation

The memorial stands at one end of Louverval Military Commonwealth War Graves Commission Cemetery, which was founded by Commonwealth troops in April 1917 on the site of Louverval Chateau in northern France.

The memorial lists the 7,048 missing soldiers of the United Kingdom and South Africa who died at the Battle of Cambrai and have no known graves.

The memorial was designed by H. Chalton Bradshaw, who also designed the Ploegsteert Memorial to the Missing in Belgium, with sculpture by Charles Sargeant Jagger.

It was unveiled on 4 August 1930 by Lieutenant-General Sir Louis Ridley Vaughan.

Notable names
The memorial holds the names of seven recipients of the Victoria Cross who have no known grave.

Private George William Burdett Clare
Private Frederick George Dancox
2nd Lt James Samuel Emerson
Major Frederick Henry Johnson
Captain Allastair Malcolm Cluny McReady-Diarmid
Captain Walter Napleton Stone
Captain Richard William Leslie Wain

References

External links
 

Commonwealth War Graves Commission memorials
World War I memorials in France
Sculptures by Charles Sargeant Jagger
Cemeteries in Nord (French department)
1930 sculptures